I Missed Flight 93 is a documentary about people who missed United Airlines Flight 93, one of the four hijacked flights as part of the September 11 attacks in 2001, for various reasons. It originally aired on the History Channel around early 2006. The documentary focuses on three people who, through a twist of fate, missed the flight. The first interviewee was Frank Robertazzi, a businessman, the second was Daniel Belardinelli, a painter, and the third was Heather Ogle, a flight surgeon.

References

Documentary films about the September 11 attacks
American documentary television films
United Airlines Flight 93
American aviation films